Caverna can refer to:
 Caverna (board game)
 Horse Cave, Kentucky